John Frederick Cooper (14 February 1855 – 30 January 1928) was an English first-class cricketer and solicitor.

Cooper was born at Henley-on-Thames in February 1855. He was educated at Marlborough College, where he played for the school cricket team. He was described by Wisden as "a very good bat, plays in beautiful form, and has a very pretty and effective cut". His one first-class appearance came for the Marylebone Cricket Club against Hampshire at Southampton in 1881, being dismissed without scoring by Charles Young in the MCC's only innings. In addition to playing first-class cricket, Cooper also played minor matches for Shropshire and Wiltshire.

Cooper was admitted as a solicitor in 1879 and later became registrar for the County Court, in addition to holding the office of Town Clerk of Henley. He was for more than thirty years the secretary of the Henley Royal Regatta, having been appointed in 1881. Cooper died at Henley in January 1928, following a brief illness of three days.

References

External links

1855 births
1928 deaths
People from Henley-on-Thames
People educated at Marlborough College
English solicitors
English cricketers
Marylebone Cricket Club cricketers
City and town clerks